Gedaliah (גדליה) is a Hebrew given name given to several men in history. It means "made great by God."

People with the name

Biblical figures

 Gedaliah, the son of Ahikam
 Fast of Gedaliah, an annual Jewish day of fasting, the third day of Tishrei
 Gedaliah, son of Pashhur, one of the nobles who conspired against Jeremiah (Jeremiah 38:1)

Others with the name
 Gedaliah ibn Yahya ben Joseph (c.1515 – c.1587), a 16th-century Italian talmudist
 Gedaliah Bublick (1875–1948), a Yiddish writer and Zionist leader
 Gedalia Schorr (1910–1979), a Polish-American rabbi who was Rosh Yeshiva (dean) of Torah Vodaath
 Gedalia Dov Schwartz (born 1925), head of the Chicago Rabbinical Council
 Gedalia Yitzhak Schwartz (born 1986), American football player now known as Geoff Schwartz

Hebrew masculine given names